The year 1946 in film involved some significant events.

Top-grossing films (U.S.)
The top ten 1946 released films by box office gross in North America are as follows:

Events
February 14 - Charles Vidor's Gilda starring Rita Hayworth and Glenn Ford shows audiences one of the most famous scenes of the 20th century: Rita Hayworth singing "Put The Blame On Mame".

November 21 – William Wyler's The Best Years of Our Lives premieres in New York featuring an ensemble cast including Fredric March, Myrna Loy, Dana Andrews, Teresa Wright, and Harold Russell.

December 20 – Frank Capra's It's a Wonderful Life, featuring James Stewart, Donna Reed, Lionel Barrymore, Henry Travers, and Thomas Mitchell opens in New York.

Awards

Notable films released in 1946
United States unless stated

A
 Angel on My Shoulder
 Anna and the King of Siam, starring Irene Dunne, Rex Harrison and Linda Darnell
 Aru yo no Tonosama

B
 Bad Bascomb, starring Wallace Beery, Margaret O'Brien and Marjorie Main
 The Bandit of Sherwood Forest, starring Cornel Wilde
 The Beast with Five Fingers, starring Robert Alda and Peter Lorre
 Beauty and the Beast (La Belle et la Bête), directed by Jean Cocteau, starring Jean Marais and Josette Day
 The Best Years of Our Lives, directed by William Wyler, starring Fredric March, Myrna Loy, Dana Andrews and Harold Russell – winner of 8 Oscars
 Beware, directed by Bud Pollard, starring Louis Jordan
 The Big Sleep, directed by Howard Hawks, starring Humphrey Bogart and Lauren Bacall
 Black Beauty, starring Mona Freeman and Richard Denning
 The Blue Dahlia, starring Alan Ladd and Veronica Lake
 Blue Skies, starring Bing Crosby and Fred Astaire
 Boom in the Moon, starring Buster Keaton
 A Boy and His Dog, starring Harry Davenport

C
 The Captive Heart, the first Prisoner of War film from World War II
 Canyon Passage, starring Dana Andrews
 Centennial Summer
 The Chase
 Children of Paradise (U.S. release)
 Cloak and Dagger
 Cluny Brown, starring Charles Boyer and Jennifer Jones

D
 The Dark Corner, starring Lucille Ball and Mark Stevens
 The Dark Mirror, starring Olivia de Havilland
 Deception
 Decoy, a film noir starring Jean Gillie
 Devotion
 The Diary of a Chambermaid
 Dragonwyck, starring Gene Tierney
 Dressed to Kill, a Sherlock Holmes mystery directed by Roy William Neill, starring Basil Rathbone as Holmes, and Nigel Bruce as Watson (released in U.K. as Sherlock Holmes and the Secret Code)
 Duel in the Sun, starring Jennifer Jones, Gregory Peck, Joseph Cotten and Lillian Gish

G
 Gallant Journey, directed by William A. Wellman
 Gilda, starring Rita Hayworth and Glenn Ford
 Great Expectations, directed by David Lean, starring John Mills, Jean Simmons and Valerie Hobson
 Green for Danger, starring Alastair Sim and Trevor Howard
 The Green Years

H
 The Harvey Girls, directed by George Sidney, starring Judy Garland and John Hodiak
 Henry V (U.S. release)
 Humoresque, starring Joan Crawford and John Garfield

I
 I See a Dark Stranger
 It's a Wonderful Life, directed by Frank Capra, starring James Stewart, Donna Reed and Lionel Barrymore
 Ivan the Terrible

J
 The Jolson Story, a biopic of Al Jolson starring Larry Parks

K
 The Kid from Brooklyn
 The Killers, directed by Robert Siodmak, starring Burt Lancaster and Ava Gardner

L
 Little Giant, starring Bud Abbott and Lou Costello

M
 Make Mine Music
 Magnificent Doll, starring Ginger Rogers and David Niven 
 A Matter of Life and Death, written and directed by Powell and Pressburger, starring David Niven
 Monsieur Beaucaire, starring Bob Hope 
 The Murderers Are Among Us (Die Mörder sind unter uns), starring Hildegard Knef
 My Darling Clementine, directed by John Ford, starring Henry Fonda and Linda Darnell

N
 Night and Day
 A Night in Casablanca with the Marx Brothers
 No Regrets for Our Youth (Waga seishun ni kuinashi)
 Nobody Lives Forever
 Notorious, directed by Alfred Hitchcock, starring Cary Grant and Ingrid Bergman

O
 The Outlaw (re-release)
 The Overlanders

P
 Paisan, directed by Roberto Rossellini (Italy)
 Patrie, directed by Louis Daquin (France)
 People Are Funny, starring Jack Haley
 The Postman Always Rings Twice, starring Lana Turner and John Garfield

R
 The Razor's Edge, starring Tyrone Power and Gene Tierney
 Renegade Girl, starring Ann Savage 
 The Return of Monte Cristo, starring Louis Hayward
 Road to Utopia, starring Bing Crosby, Dorothy Lamour and Bob Hope

S
 The Seventh Veil (U.S. release)
 She-Wolf of London. starring June Lockhart
 Shoeshine (Sciuscià), directed by Vittorio De Sica
 Shock, directed by Alfred L. Werker, starring Vincent Price and Lynn Bari 
 Sister Kenny, starring Rosalind Russell
 Somewhere In The Night, starring John Hodiak
 Song of the South by Walt Disney, combines animation and live action.
 The Spiral Staircase, starring Dorothy McGuire
 A Stolen Life, starring Bette Davis
 The Strange Love of Martha Ivers, starring Barbara Stanwyck
 The Strange Woman, starring Hedy Lamarr and George Sanders
 The Stranger, directed by and starring Orson Welles, Loretta Young and Edward G. Robinson

T
 Terror by Night, a Sherlock Holmes mystery directed by Roy William Neill, starring Basil Rathbone as Holmes, and Nigel Bruce as Watson
 Theirs Is the Glory
 Three Strangers
 Three Wise Fools, starring Margaret O'Brien and Lionel Barrymore
 The Time of Their Lives, starring Bud Abbott and Lou Costello
 To Each His Own, starring Olivia de Havilland
 Tomorrow Is Forever, starring Orson Welles
 Two Sisters from Boston, starring Kathryn Grayson, June Allyson, Lauritz Melchior, Jimmy Durante and Peter Lawford.

U
 Utamaro and His Five Women (Utamaro o meguru gonin no onna)

V
 The Verdict

W
 Wake Up and Dream
 Wanted for Murder
 The Wife of Monte Cristo, directed by Edgar G. Ulmer
 Without Reservations

Y
 The Yearling, starring Gregory Peck and Jane Wyman

Serials
Daughter of Don Q
Chick Carter, Detective
The Crimson Ghost
Hop Harrigan
King of the Forest Rangers, starring Larry Thompson
Lost City of the Jungle
The Mysterious Mr. M
The Phantom Rider, starring Robert Kent and Peggy Stewart
The Scarlet Horseman
Son of the Guardsman

Short film series
Shirley Temple (1932–1946)
The Three Stooges (1934–1959)
Popular Science (1935–1950)

Animated short film series
Mickey Mouse (1928–1952)
Looney Tunes (1930–1969)
Terrytoons (1930–1964)
Merrie Melodies (1931–1969)
Popeye (1933–1957)
Color Rhapsodies (1934–1949)
Donald Duck (1936–1956)
Pluto (1937–1951)
Andy Panda (1939–1949)
Goofy (1939–1953)
Bugs Bunny (1940–1962)
Tom and Jerry (1940–1958)
The Fox and the Crow (1941–1950)
Woody Woodpecker (1941–1949)
Mighty Mouse (1942–1955)
Droopy (1943–1958)
Chip and Dale (1943–1956)
Screwball Squirrel (1944–1946)
Yosemite Sam (1945–1963)
George and Junior (1946–1948)

Births
January 5 – Diane Keaton, American actress, producer and director
January 7 – Arnis Līcītis, Latvian actor (d. 2022)
January 14 – Jack Thibeau, American actor
January 19 – Dolly Parton, American country singer and actress 
January 20 – David Lynch, American director
January 26 – Gene Siskel, film critic, Siskel and Ebert (d. 1999)
February 2 – Blake Clark, American stand-up comedian, actor and voice actor
February 3 – Stephen McHattie, Canadian actor
February 7 – Pete Postlethwaite, English actor (d. 2011)
February 8 – Alex Diakun, Canadian actor
February 13 – Joe Estevez, American actor, director and producer
February 20 – Brenda Blethyn, English actress
February 21 
Tyne Daly, American actress
Anthony Daniels, English actor, voice actor and mime artist
Alan Rickman, English actor (d. 2016)
March 1 - Lana Wood, American actress and producer
March 6 - Martin Kove, American actor and martial artist
March 7
Dan Grimaldi, American actor
John Heard (actor), American actor (d. 2017)
March 9 - Alexandra Bastedo, British actress (d. 2014)
March 12
Dean Cundey, American cinematographer and filmmaker
Liza Minnelli, American singer and actress
Frank Welker, American actor, voice actor and former stand-up comedian
March 21 – Timothy Dalton, British actor
March 29 – Paul Herman, American actor (d. 2022)
April 12 – Ed O'Neill, American actor and comedian
April 15
Bob DeSimone, American actor
Michael Tucci, American actor
April 19 – Tim Curry, English actor and singer
April 20 – Haruhiko Yamanouchi, Japanese actor
April 23 – Blair Brown, American actress
April 25 – Talia Shire, American actress
April 29 – Wayne Robson, Canadian actor (d. 2011)
May 1
Joanna Lumley, British actress
John Woo, Hong Kong director, producer and screenwriter
May 2 – David Suchet, English actor
May 9 – Candice Bergen, American actress
May 11 – Ago Roo, Estonian actor
May 13 – Tim Pigott-Smith, English actor (d. 2017)
May 18 – Andreas Katsulas, American actor (d. 2006)
May 19 – André the Giant, French professional wrestler and actor (d. 1993)
May 20 – Cher, American singer and actress
May 22 – Jack Kehler, American character actor (d. 2022)
June 1 – Brian Cox (actor), Scottish actor
June 3 – Penelope Wilton, English actress
June 5 - John Bach, British-born New Zealand actor
June 15
Angela Down, English actress
Roy Holder, English actor (d. 2021)
June 26 – Ricky Jay, American actor and writer (d. 2018)
June 28
Bruce Davison, American actor and director
Gilda Radner, American comedian and actress (d. 1989)
July 2 – Ron Silver, American actor (d. 2009)
July 6 – Sylvester Stallone, actor and director
July 10 – Sue Lyon, actress (d. 2019)
July 13 – Cheech Marin, American actor and comedian
July 14 – Vincent Pastore, American actor
July 16 – Richard LeParmentier, American actor (d. 2013)
July 17 – Alun Armstrong, English actor
July 18 – Dicken Ashworth, English actor
July 22 – Danny Glover, actor and director
July 27 – Rade Šerbedžija, Croatian actor, director and musician
August 6 – Peter Simonischek, Austrian actor
August 16 – Lesley Ann Warren, American actress and singer
August 19 – Christopher Malcolm, Scottish actor, director and producer (d. 2014)
August 29 – Lindy Davies, Australian actress and director
August 30 - Peggy Lipton, American actress, model and singer (d. 2019)
September 5 – Dennis Dugan, American director, actor, writer and comedian
September 13 – Frank Marshall (filmmaker), American producer and director
September 15 
Tommy Lee Jones, actor
Oliver Stone, director and producer
September 18 – Gailard Sartain, American actor
September 28 – Jeffrey Jones, American actor
October 2 – Dale Soules, American actress
October 4 – Susan Sarandon, American actress
October 10
Charles Dance, English actor
Ben Vereen, American actor
October 15 – John Getz, American actor
October 22 – Richard McGonagle, American actor
October 27 – Ivan Reitman, Slovakian-born Canadian director and producer (d. 2022)
October 31 – Stephen Rea, Northern Irish actor
November 3 – Tom Savini, American prosthetic makeup artist, actor, stunt performer and director
November 6 – Sally Field, actress
November 7 – John Aylward, American actor (d. 2022)
November 20 – Samuel E. Wright, American actor and singer (d. 2021)
November 22 – Paul A. Partain, American actor (d. 2005)
December 4 – Cheng Pei-pei, Chinese actress
December 8 – Frank Pesce, American actor (d. 2022)
December 14 – Patty Duke, American actress (d. 2016)
December 17
Jayne Eastwood, Canadian actress and comedian
Eugene Levy, Canadian actor
December 18 – Steven Spielberg, American director and producer
December 20 – John Spencer (actor), American actor (d. 2005)
December 25 – Stuart Wilson (actor), English actor
December 31 - Margaret Travolta, American actress
unknown – Omar Al-Shammaa, Lebanese actor, voice actor

Deaths
January 13 – Enid Stamp Taylor, English actress
February 5 – George Arliss, English actor
April 1 – Noah Beery Sr., American actor
June 23 – William S. Hart, American actor
July 10 - Slim Summerville, American actor and director
August 8 – Paul Porcasi, Italian actor
August 10 – Léon Gaumont, French film pioneer 
August 12 – Egon Brecher,  Austrian actor, director
August 13 – H. G. Wells, British science fiction writer
August 26 – Jeanie MacPherson, American actress and screenwriter 
August 28 – Florence Turner, American actress
September 21 – Olga Engl, Austrian actress
October 8 – John St. Polis, American actor
November 2 – Gabriel Gabrio, French actor
November 18 – Donald Meek, Scottish-American actor
December 12 – Renée Jeanne Falconetti, French actress
December 25 – W. C. Fields, American comedian and actor

Film Debuts
 Kirk Douglas
 Burt Lancaster
 Raymond Burr

References

 
Film by year